The General Dynamics–Grumman EF-111A Raven is a retired electronic-warfare aircraft designed to replace the EB-66 Destroyer in the United States Air Force. Its crews and maintainers often called it the "Spark-Vark", a play on the F-111's "Aardvark" nickname.

The USAF contracted with Grumman in 1974 to convert some existing General Dynamics F-111As into electronic warfare/electronic countermeasures (ECM) aircraft.  The USAF had considered the Navy / Marine Corps Grumman EA-6B Prowler, but desired a penetrating aircraft with supersonic speed.  The EF-111 entered service in 1983 and served until its retirement in 1998.

Design and development
In the late 1960s, the U.S. Air Force sought to replace its aging EB-66 and EB-57 electronic warfare aircraft. The Air Force studied the use of Navy EA-6B Prowlers during 1967–1968. However, the Air Force desired a penetrating electronic jamming aircraft with supersonic speed, and, in 1972, decided to modify F-111As into electronic warfare aircraft as a cost-effective option.

In January 1974, the Air Force awarded electronic warfare study contracts to Grumman and General Dynamics. Grumman was selected as the EF-111 prime contractor in December 1974, then was awarded a contract to modify two F-111As into EF-111 prototypes in January 1975. The first fully equipped model, known then as the "Electric Fox", flew on 10 March 1977. A total of 42 airframes were converted at a total cost of US$1.5 billion. The first EF-111s were deployed in November 1981 to the 388th Tactical Electronic Squadron, Mountain Home AFB, Idaho. The last was delivered in 1985.

The Raven retained the F-111A's navigation systems, with a revised AN/APQ-160 radar primarily for ground mapping. The primary feature of the Raven, however, was the AN/ALQ-99E jamming system, developed from the Navy's ALQ-99 on the Prowler. The aircraft also utilized the ALR-62 Countermeasures Receiving System (CRS) as a Radar Homing and Warning (RHAW) System, the same system carried by all F-111 fighter/bomber models in the United States and Australia. Receivers were installed in a fin-tip pod, or "football", similar to that of the EA-6B. The aircraft's electrical and cooling systems had to be extensively upgraded to support this equipment. The cockpit was also rearranged, with all flight and navigation displays relocated to the pilot's side, and flight controls except throttles being removed from the other seat, where the electronic warfare officer's instrumentation and controls were installed.

The EF-111 was unarmed. Its speed and acceleration were its main means of self-defense. It was not capable of firing anti-radiation missiles in the Suppression of Enemy Air Defenses (SEAD) role, which was a tactical limitation. The Raven's engines were upgraded to the more powerful TF30-P-9 of the D-model, with  dry and  afterburning thrust in 1986. From 1987 to 1994 the "Spark 'Vark" underwent an Avionics Modernization Program (AMP), similar to the Pacer Strike program for the F-model. This added a dual AN/ASN-41 ring laser gyroscope INS, AN/APN-218 Doppler radar, and an updated AN/APQ-146 terrain-following radar. Cockpit displays were upgraded with multi-function displays.

Operational history

The EF-111A achieved initial operational capability in 1983. The EF-111A received the official popular name Raven, although in service it acquired the nickname "Spark 'Vark".  EF-111s first saw combat use with the 20th Tactical Fighter Wing at RAF Upper Heyford during Operation El Dorado Canyon against Libya in 1986, and Operation Just Cause in Panama during late 1989.

The Raven served in the Gulf War during Operation Desert Storm in 1991. On 17 January 1991, a USAF EF-111 crew of Captain James Denton and Captain Brent Brandon achieved an unofficial kill against an Iraqi Dassault Mirage F1, which they managed to maneuver into the ground, making it the only member of the F-111/FB-111/EF-111 family to achieve an aerial victory over another aircraft.

On 13 February 1991, EF-111A, AF Ser. No. 66-0023, call sign Ratchet 75, crashed into terrain while maneuvering to evade a perceived threat. killing the pilot, Capt Douglas L. Bradt, and the EWO, Capt Paul R. Eichenlaub. It was the only EF-111A lost during combat, the only loss killing its crew, and one of just three EF-111s lost during the aircraft's service. However, it is disputed whether there was an enemy present at the time, as two F-15Es watched Ratchet 75 make violent evasive maneuvers and crash into the ground, with no hostile aircraft in the area.

Later action
EF-111s were deployed to Aviano Air Base, Italy in support of Operation Deliberate Force during the mid-1990s.  The Raven also flew missions in Operation Provide Comfort, Operation Northern Watch and Operation Southern Watch.

The last deployment of the Raven was a detachment of EF-111s stationed at Al Kharj/Prince Sultan Air Base in Saudi Arabia until April 1998. Shortly afterward, the USAF began withdrawing the final EF-111As from service, and placed them in storage at the Aerospace Maintenance and Regeneration Center (AMARC) at Davis-Monthan AFB, Arizona.  The last EF-111s were retired on 2 May 1998, at Cannon AFB, New Mexico.  These were the final USAF F-111s in service.

Variants
EF-111A
 Electronic warfare conversion of the F-111A, 42 conversions including two prototypes.

Operators

United States Air Force
Tactical Air Command 1981–92
Air Combat Command 1992–98
20th Tactical Fighter Wing – RAF Upper Heyford, England
42d Electronic Combat Squadron (1984–1992)
27th Fighter Wing – Cannon AFB, New Mexico
429th Electronic Combat Squadron (1992–1998)
430th Electronic Combat Squadron (1992–1993)
366th Tactical Fighter Wing – Mountain Home AFB, Idaho
388th Electronic Combat Squadron (1981–1982)
390th Electronic Combat Squadron (1982–1992)

Aircraft on display 

Of the converted aircraft, three were destroyed in crashes, four are on display, and the other 35 were scrapped.
 66-0016 is on display at Cannon Air Force Base, New Mexico.  It was the first EF-111 to fly a combat mission and was unofficially credited with the Mirage F1 kill.
 66-0047 was being restored at Silver Springs Airport, Silver Springs, Nevada in 2013.
 66-0049 was the first prototype EF-111 and is on display at Mountain Home Air Force Base, Idaho.
 66-0057 is on display at the National Museum of the United States Air Force in at Wright-Patterson Air Force Base in Dayton, Ohio.

Specifications (EF-111A)

Specifications are for EF-111A except where noted.

See also

References
Notes

Citations

Bibliography

 Eden, Paul, ed. "General Dynamics F-111 Aardvark/EF-111 Raven". Encyclopedia of Modern Military Aircraft. London: Amber Books, 2004. .
 Gunston, Bill. F-111, Modern Fighting Aircraft, Vol. 3. New York: Salamander Books, 1983. .
 Logan, Don. General Dynamics F-111 Aardvark. Atglen, Pennsylvania: Schiffer Military History, 1998. .
 Miller, Jay. General Dynamics F-111 "Arardvark". Fallbrook, California: Aero Publishers, 1982. .
 Thornborough, Anthony M. and Peter E. Davies. F-111 Success in Action. London: Arms and Armour Press, 1989. .

External links 

General Dynamics EF-111A Raven – National Museum of the United States Air Force
 EF-111 page on GlobalSecurity.org
 Future Of Airborne Tactical Jamming report

EF-111
EF-111
1970s United States electronic warfare aircraft
Twinjets
High-wing aircraft
Variable-sweep-wing aircraft
Aircraft first flown in 1977